Raynel Joseph Espinal (born October 6, 1991) is a Dominican professional baseball pitcher for the Tokyo Yakult Swallows of Nippon Professional Baseball (NPB). He has previously played in Major League Baseball (MLB) for the Boston Red Sox and Cincinnati Reds.

Professional career

New York Yankees
Espinal began his professional career with the New York Yankees organization, first playing for the Dominican Summer League Yankees in 2013 and 2014. After not playing professionally during 2015, he played for four different Yankees farm teams during 2016, advancing to the Class A Short Season level with the Staten Island Yankees. In 2017, he played for three different teams and reached Double-A with the Trenton Thunder. Espinal then spent all of the 2018 and 2019 seasons in Triple-A with the Scranton/Wilkes-Barre RailRiders. With the RailRiders, he appeared in 59 total games (15 starts) allowing 64 runs in 142 innings pitched for a 4.06 earned run average (ERA). In July 2019, Espinal underwent Tommy John surgery.

Boston Red Sox
The Red Sox selected Espinal from the Yankees in the minor league phase of the Rule 5 draft after the 2019 season. He did not pitch during 2020, due to cancellation of the minor-league season, then began the 2021 season in Triple-A with the Worcester Red Sox. The Red Sox promoted Espinal to the major leagues on August 30, 2021, to add bullpen depth due to players being placed on the COVID-related list. He made his MLB debut that day, pitching in relief against the Tampa Bay Rays. He was returned to Worcester the next day and removed from the 40-man roster. Worcester named Espinal their pitcher of the year, having gone 11–4 with a 3.55 ERA in Triple-A.
Espinal became a free agent following the 2021 season.

San Francisco Giants
On February 5, 2022, Espinal signed a minor-league contract with the San Francisco Giants. He began the season in Triple-A with the Sacramento River Cats of the Pacific Coast League.

Chicago Cubs
On July 31, 2022, the Giants traded Espinal to the Chicago Cubs for Dixon Machado. On August 16 the Chicago Cubs released Espinal making him a free agent.

Cincinnati Reds
On August 18, 2022, Espinal signed a minor league deal with the Cincinnati Reds. He had his contract selected on September 11, 2022. He elected free agency on November 10, 2022.

Tokyo Yakult Swallows
On December 5, 2022, Espinal signed with the Tokyo Yakult Swallows of Nippon Professional Baseball.

International career
Espinal pitched for the Dominican Republic national baseball team during qualification for the 2020 Summer Olympics. He has played several seasons of winter baseball with Gigantes del Cibao of the Dominican Professional Baseball League (LIDOM).

See also
Rule 5 draft results

References

External links

Living people
1991 births
People from Santiago Province (Dominican Republic)
Dominican Republic expatriate baseball players in the United States
Major League Baseball players from the Dominican Republic
Major League Baseball pitchers
Boston Red Sox players
Cincinnati Reds players
Dominican Summer League Yankees players
Gulf Coast Yankees players
Pulaski Yankees players
Staten Island Yankees players
Charleston RiverDogs players
Tampa Yankees players
Trenton Thunder players
Gigantes del Cibao players
Sacramento River Cats players
Scranton/Wilkes-Barre RailRiders players
Worcester Red Sox players